Jakarta City Hall is the seat of the Jakarta City government. The complex contains the official office of the governor and the vice governor of Jakarta, and the main administrative office. Jakarta City Hall is located south of Merdeka Square.

Building complex

Jakarta Governor's office
The building is the office of the governor of Jakarta. Built in the early 19th-century, it is the oldest building in the Jakarta City Hall complex. It was originally used as the office and residence of the Resident of West Java. The Jakarta Governor's office is a typical Indies Empire style structure, with symmetrical classical proportions and rows of Tuscan-order columns at its front elevation.

Building G
Constructed in 1972 as a model for ideal skyscrapers in Jakarta.

History

Dutch colonial period

The first city hall of Jakarta was built on 4 March 1621 as the city of Batavia was developing. This city hall, which has been converted into the Jakarta History Museum, was the original administrative center of Batavia.

Initially, the council still operated from the old city hall in the Old Town. The growth of Batavia to the southern area of Weltevreden forced many government buildings to relocate their address to the south, including the city hall. In 1913, the council was relocated to Tanah Abang West (now Jalan Abdul Muis no. 35). In 1919, the council was relocated again to the current building in Koningsplein Zuid (now Jalan Medan Merdeka Selatan no. 8-9). At that time, building no. 8 was used for the office and residence of the Resident of West Java, while building no. 9 was the Gemeentehuis Batavia and the official residence of the Burgemeester. Building no. 9 was fully converted into a city hall when the official residence of the Burgemeester was moved to a new building near the Bisschopplein (now Taman Suropati), located in Jalan Suropati 7.

On 1 October 1926, Gemeentehuis Batavia became the Stad Gemeentehuis Batavia.

Japanese occupation and National Revolution
After independence, the name of the building became  (Great Hall of the National Administration of Djakarta City), with Suwiryo as its first native mayor. Since then, Jakarta's administration has continued to be based in the same building.

On 21 July 1947, the new administration of Jakarta was unable to operate when Suwiryo and the new government of Jakarta was driven out of the office by the Dutch government, who at that time had not recognized the independence declaration on 17 August 1945. On 9 March 1948, the Dutch government formed a pre-federal governorship to replace the former government, and converted Jakarta into the capital of the country.

Post-National Revolution
Around 1954, the city hall was expanded to include building no. 8, hence now Jakarta City Hall occupies two building plots. The office building of the High Commissioner of the Kingdom of the Netherlands, which was located next to Jakarta City Hall, was also used as government offices for the Mutual Assistance Regional Representatives Council (Dewan Perwakilan Rakyat Daerah Gotong Rojong). The office of the High Commissioner of the Kingdom of the Netherlands was then relocated to Jalan Medan Merdeka Barat.

Next development

From 1960, Jakarta was headed by a governor after its status was upgraded from municipality to province. In 1964, Jakarta officially became the capital of Indonesia. The governor remained an appointee of the president until 2007, when the first citywide elections for governors were held together with the usual legislative election.

In 1969, Jakarta City Hall expanded, with construction of Building C (Balai Agung) and the 4-story building F.

In 1972, the government of DCI Djakarta changed its name to Daerah Khusus Ibu Kota (DKI) Jakarta following the implementation of the Enhanced Indonesian Spelling System. In the same year, the old colonial building located on plot 9 was demolished to make way for the 24-story Building G. Construction of this building was meant to be a pilot project for other highrises in Jakarta and a reference to lay out new regulations on highrises in the city. In the same year, the complex of the City Hall was expanded toward Jalan Kebon Sirih, with the construction of building H. Afterwards, new buildings were established in the complex, which now includes Building D and Building F. In 1982, the DPRD DKI building was constructed on Jalan Kebon Sirih.

Present

During the tenure of Governor Basuki Tjahaja Purnama, the colonial City Hall building at number 8 was opened to the public on 12 September 2015. Visitors can also see a variety of Indonesian films screened every weekend at the Great Hall Building.

See also
 List of colonial buildings and structures in Jakarta
 Indies Empire style

References

Cited works

External links

 Gedung Balai Kota
 Jakarta Balai Kota
 Sejarah Panjang Kompleks Balai Kota Jakarta
 Wisata Balai Kota Resmi Dibuka

Buildings and structures in Jakarta
City and town halls in Indonesia
Dutch colonial architecture in Indonesia
Art Deco architecture in Indonesia